Glenn Moore is the head coach of the Baylor Lady Bears softball team. In twenty-five seasons as a collegiate head coach, Moore has a coaching record of 941–442.

Coaching career

LSU
Prior to coming to Baylor, Moore spent more than three seasons as head coach at LSU. Moore led LSU to the Southeastern Conference championship in 1999 and 2000. While at LSU, Moore had a 117–25 record, including a 53–7 record in the SEC.

Moore was named LSU's head coach prior to the 1998 NCAA Regionals, where he led the Lady Tigers to a 2–2 mark. His first full season as head coach, 1999, saw the Lady Tigers go 56–10 and win both the SEC regular season and tournament titles. LSU repeated its regular-season crown in 2000, going 59–13 and setting a school record for wins while advancing to within a game of the Women's College World Series. LSU appeared in three-straight NCAA tournaments under Moore.

William Carey
Before his time at LSU, Moore spent one season as the head coach at William Carey College in Hattiesburg, Mississippi. Moore was 22–17 that season and guided the college to a second-place finish in the Gulf South Conference.

Early coaching career
While enrolled at Northwestern State University, Moore was a volunteer assistant softball coach for two seasons before becoming a full-time assistant in 1992. After coaching football, baseball and basketball at Amite School Center in his hometown of Liberty, Mississippi, he left to coach at William Carey, where he started the softball program.

Playing career
Moore's own athletic career saw him play both football and baseball at Southwest Mississippi Community College before playing tight end at Northwestern State University, where he graduated in 1993. He was inducted into Southwest Mississippi Community College's Hall of Fame in the fall of 2000.

Head coaching record

College

 *Served as head coach during the NCAA Tournament.

References

External links 
 Profile at Baylor Athletic Site

Year of birth missing (living people)
Living people
American softball coaches
LSU Tigers softball coaches
Baylor Bears softball coaches
William Carey Crusaders softball coaches
Northwestern State Lady Demons softball coaches